Incognia is a digital identity company.

History 

Incognia was founded in 2020  and secures over 200M devices worldwide. It is a venture-backed company headquartered in California, with teams in Palo Alto, New York, and Brazil.

Although the company was founded in 2020, Incognia’s location technology was originally developed as an indoor navigation tool.

Eventually, Incognia’s core technology was applied to digital marketing, and that business was acquired in 2019.

Since then, Incognia has adapted its location technology to solve critical digital identity challenges. In 2022, Incognia’s engineering team published a paper entitled “Using Location as a Signal to Affirm Identity Online.” The report shows Incognia’s Location Identity can identify an individual with an accuracy rate of 1 out of 17 million using five spatiotemporal points.

In 2022, Incognia raised $15.5 million in Series A funding led by Point72 Ventures to support its growth aspirations.

See also 

 Digital Identity 
 Location-Based Authentication
 Multi-factor authentication
 Spoofing Attack 
 Address Verification Service 
 Location Intelligence
 Geolocation in Online Gambling 
 Passwordless Authentication
 Location-based service 
 Food Delivery
 Authentication

References 

Identity management
American companies established in 2020
Companies based in Palo Alto, California